Quzanlı is a village and the most populous municipality in the Aghdam District of Azerbaijan. It has a population of 13,002. The municipality consists of the villages of Guzanly, Birinji Guzanly, Eyvazly, Chullu, and Imamgulubeyli.

Since 2009 Guzanly has been cited as the rather unlikely home to one of Azerbaijan's top football clubs, FK Qarabagh. The team had been based in Baku from 1993 ever since being forced to leave Aghdam where they were originally based. The total depopulation and continued occupation of that city means that Guzanly, being in the unoccupied sector of Aghdam District, is about as near as they could get to a full "return home".

Notable natives 
 Rovshan Huseynov — National Hero of Azerbaijan.

References 

Guzanli Olympic Stadium

Populated places in Aghdam District